The 2014–15 season was the 105th season of competitive football in Germany.

Promotion and relegation

Pre–Season

Post–Season

National teams

Germany national football team

After Germany won the 2014 FIFA World Cup, team captain Philipp Lahm announced his retirement from international football.  Germany's record goalscorer Miroslav Klose also announced his retirement from international football.  Per Mertesacker would join Lahm and Klose in retiring from international duty.  On , Bastian Schweinsteiger was announced as the new captain for Germany.

UEFA Euro 2016 qualifying

UEFA Euro 2016 qualifying review
The group also contains Georgia, Gibraltar, Ireland, Poland, and Scotland. Germany won the match 2–1. Thomas Müller scored both goals for Germany and Ikechi Anya scored for Scotland. A foul from Charlie Mulgrew caused an injury to the left foot of Marco Reus. This foot is the same one that was injured and kept him from attending the World Cup. During stoppage time, Mulgrew was shown a second yellow card and sent off. After the first round of matches, Germany and Ireland were tied for second place in the group. Germany suffered their first competitive defeat since winning the World Cup on  when Poland defeated Germany for the first time. The final score was 0–2. Germany were in third place after this matchday. A stoppage time goal from Ireland's John O'Shea cancelled out an earlier goal from Toni Kroos to cause Germany and Ireland to finish the match on  tied 1–1. Germany remained in third place. On  Germany defeated Gibraltar 4–0. Thomas Müller scored two goals before Mario Götze scored one goal to make the score 3–0 at half time. The final goal of the match was an own goal by Yogan Santos. After this matchday, Germany moved to second place in the group. Germany defeated Georgia 2–0 due to one goal each from Reus and Müller before half-time. After this round of matches, Germany were one point behind group leaders Poland.

UEFA Euro 2016 qualifying Group D table

UEFA Euro 2016 qualifying fixtures and results

Friendly matches

Germany women's national football team

2015 FIFA Women's World Cup qualification

2015 FIFA Women's World Cup

Germany were placed in Group B along with Ivory Coast, Norway, and Thailand.

2015 Algarve Cup

On  it was announced that Germany were placed in Group A along with Brazil, China, and Sweden.

Ranking of teams for placement matches

Friendly matches

League season

Men

Bundesliga

Bundesliga review

Bundesliga standings

2. Bundesliga

2. Bundesliga review
The 2.

2. Bundesliga standings

3. Liga

3. Liga review
The 3.

3. Liga standings

German clubs in Europe

UEFA Champions League

Bayer Leverkusen

Bayer Leverkusen qualified for the play-off round of the Champions League by finishing in fourth place in the 2013–14 Bundesliga. Bayer Leverkusen were paired with F.C. Copenhagen. Bayer Leverkusen won the match 3–2. Bayer Leverkusen won the match 4–0 which resulted in an aggregate score of 7–2. Leverkusen were drawn into Group C.  The first group stage match wias played on  against Monaco at Stade Louis II. Leverkusen lost the match 0–1. Bayer Leverkusen won the match 3–1. Leverkusen were in third place in Group C after the second matchday. Despite being reduced to ten men in the 79th minute, Leverkusen won the match 2–0. Leverkusen moved into first place in the group after this round of matches. Leverkusen won this match 2–1. They remained in first place after this matchday. After this matchday, Bayer Leverkusen's group lead shrank to one point. Bayer Leverkusen were drawn against Atlético Madrid. After thirty minutes of extra time were played, the aggregate score remained tied. During the penalty shootout, Ateltico made three successful kicks while  Bayer Leverkusen were successful only twice and were thus eliminated from the competition.

Bayern Munich

As champions of the 2013–14 Bundesliga, Bayern Munich qualified for the group stage of the Champions League. Bayern were drawn into Group E.  Their first group stage match was played on  against Manchester City at the Allianz Arena. Bayern won the match 1–0. After this matchday, Bayern were in second place in Group E.  Their second group game was played on  against CSKA Moscow. Bayern won the match 1–0. The match was played in an empty Arena Khimki. Bayern won the match 7–1. They were still in first place after this matchday. Bayern won the match 2–0. This victory secured first place in the group for Bayern with two matches remaining. Manchester City won the match 3–2. Bayern defeated CSKA 3–0. The match was played in Lviv instead of Donetsk due to unrest in Ukraine. Xabi Alonso, who made his 100th appearance in the competition, was sent off in the 66th minute. The final score, as well as aggregate score was 7–0.

Borussia Dortmund

As runners-up of the 2013–14 Bundesliga, Borussia Dortmund qualified for the group stage of the Champions League. Dortmund were drawn into Group D.  Their first match of the group stage was played on  against Arsenal at Westfalenstadion in Dortmund. Borussia Dortmund won the match 2–0. Dortmund were in first place in Group D after this matchday. The second group stage match was played on  against Anderlecht at Constant Vanden Stock Stadium. Dortmund won the match 3–0. They were in first place in Group D after the second matchday. Dortmund won the match 4–1 and secured a place in the round of 16. The match finished as a 1–1 draw between Anderlecht and Dortmund. On , Borussia Dortmund were drawn against Juventus for the round of 16. On , Dortmund lost the first leg 2–1. This time the score was 3–0 in favor of Juventus. The aggregate score after both legs was 1–5 which eliminated Borussia Dortmund.

Schalke 04

FC Schalke 04 finished in third place in the 2013–14 Bundesliga which qualified them for the group stage of the Champions League. The match ended as a 1–1 draw. All four teams were tied for first place in Group G after this matchday. The second group stage match was played on  against Maribor. This match also ended as a 1–1 draw. After the second matchday, Schalke were tied with Maribor for second place in Group G.  Schalke defeated Sporting Lisbon on  4–3. Schalke were now solely in second place. Schalke lost the match 2–4. After this matchday, Schalke fell to third place in the group. A victory over Maribor by the score 1–0 on  secured second place in the group and a place in the round of 16. The round of 16 draw on  paired Schalke with defending champions Real Madrid. Schalke lost the match 0–2. However, due to an aggregate score of 4–5, they were eliminated from the competition.

UEFA Europa League

Borussia Mönchengladbach

Borussia Mönchengladbach qualified for the play-off round of the Europa League by finishing in sixth place in the 2013–14 Bundesliga. Mönchengladbach were paired with FK Sarajevo. Borussia Mönchengladbach won the match 3–2. Gladbach won the match 7–0. The aggregate score of 10–2 allowed Gladbach to advance to the group stage. The match ended as a 1–1 draw. Gladbach were tied for second place in Group A after this matchday. The match ended as a 1–1 draw. Gladbach won the match 5–0 and moved to second place in the group. Borussia Mönchengladbach won the match 2–0 to move to first place in the group. The match between Villareal and Gladbach on  ended as a 2–2 draw. Gladbach remained in first place after this matchday. Gladbach defeated Zürich 3–0. This victory secured first place in the group. Borussia Mönchengladbach were paired with Sevilla.

Mainz 05

FSV Mainz 05 finished in seventh place in the 2013–14 Bundesliga and were qualified for the third qualifying round of the Europa League. Mainz won the match 1–0. Mainz lost the match 1–3. The aggregate score of 2–3 resulted in Mainz being eliminated from the competition.

VfL Wolfsburg

VfL Wolfsburg finished the 2013–14 Bundesliga in fifth place which earned them a berth in the group stage of the Europa League. Wolfsburg lost the match 1–4. They were in last place in Group H after this matchday. The match ended as a 1–1 draw. Wolfsburg were still at the bottom of the group after this matchday. Wolfsburg won the match 4–2. Wolfsburg were in third place in the group after this matchday. Wolfsburg remained in second place after this matchday. Despite the defeat, Wolfsburg remained in second place in the group after this matchday. The draw for the round of 32 on  paired Wolfsburg with Sporting Lisbon.

UEFA Women's Champions League

FFC Frankfurt

1. FFC Frankfurt finished as runners-up in the 2013–14 Bundesliga (women) and earned a berth in the Round of 32 of the Women's Champions League. On , Frankfurt were drawn against BIIK Kazygurt for the round of 32. The match ended as a 2–2 draw. Frankfurt won the match 4–0. With an aggregate score of 6–2, Frankfurt advanced to the Round of 16 where they were paired with Torres. Frankfurt won this match 4–0 which resulted in an aggregate score of 9–0. The draw for the quarter-finals resulted in Frankfurt facing Bristol Academy.

VfL Wolfsburg

VfL Wolfsburg (women) won both the 2013–14 UEFA Women's Champions League and 2013–14 Bundesliga (women). These championships qualified them for the Round of 32 of the Women's Champions League. Wolfsburg won the match 1–0. Wolfsburg were victorious as the match ended 2–1. They advanced to the Round of 16 with an aggregate score of 3–1. They will play against SV Neulengbach in the Round of 16. Wolfsburg won the match 4–0. The aggregate score for this round was 11–0. Wolfsburg was paired with FC Rosengård for the quarter-finals.

Managerial changes

Deaths
 July 2014 – Burkhardt Öller, 73, goalkeeper for Eintracht Braunschweig and Hannover 96.
 3 July 2014 – Volkmar Groß, 66, goalkeeper for Hertha BSC, FC Schalke 04, and Tennis Borussia Berlin.
 14 July 2014 – Horacio Troche, 79, defender for Alemannia Aachen and Bonner SC.
 18 July 2014 – Andreas Biermann, 33, defender for Chemnitzer FC, FC St. Pauli, and 1. FC Union Berlin among others.
 3 August 2014 – Helmut Faeder, 79, striker for Hertha BSC and Hertha Zehlendorf who earned one cap for West Germany.
 11 August 2014 – Vladimir Beara, 85, former goalkeeper for FC Viktoria Köln who also managed Freiburger FC and Viktoria Köln.
 13 August 2014 – Kurt Tschenscher, 85, a German referee who was the first referee to show a yellow card when he did so at the 1970 FIFA World Cup.
 6 October 2014 – Feridun Buğeker, 81, forward for Stuttgarter Kickers
 27 December 2014 – Erich Retter, 89, defender for VfB Stuttgart and West Germany.
 10 January 2015 – Junior Malanda, 20, midfielder for VfL Wolfsburg
 11 January 2015 – Fritz Pott, 75, defender for 1. FC Köln who earned three caps for West Germany.
 1 February 2015 – Udo Lattek, 80, striker for VfL Osnabrück and others who also was manager for Bayern Munich and Borussia Mönchengladbach among others.
 1 February 2015 – Julius Ludorf, 95, forward for SpVgg Erkenschwick.
 9 February 2015 – Horst Borcherding, 84, goalkeeper for VfL Osnabrück and SV Saar 05 Saarbrücken who earned 3 caps for Saarland.
 10 February 2015 – Manfred Wagner, 76, defender for TSV 1860 München.

Sources

 
Seasons in German football